Stenakron is a genus of trematodes in the family Opecoelidae.

Species
Stenakron mancopsetti Gaevskaya & Kovaleva, 1977
Stenakron quadrilobatum (Bazikalova, 1932)
Stenakron quinquelobatum (Layman, 1930) Mamaev, Parukhin & Baeva, 1963
Stenakron skrjabini (Issaitchikov, 1928) Yamaguti, 1971
Stenakron vetustum Stafford, 1904
Stenakron vitellosum (Manter, 1934) Cribb, 2005

References

Opecoelidae
Plagiorchiida genera